Nobel's Last Will is a 2012 Swedish drama film directed by Peter Flinth.

Cast 
 Malin Crépin as Annika Bengtzon
 Björn Kjellman as Anders Schyman
 Leif Andrée as Spiken
 Kajsa Ernst as Berit Hamrin
 Erik Johansson as Patrik Nilsson
  as Q
 Richard Ulfsäter as Thomas Samuelsson
 Antje Traue as Kitten
  as Bernhard Thorell
 Björn Granath as Ernst Ericsson
 Maria Langhammer as Birgitta Larsén

References

External links 

2012 drama films
2012 films
Films about fictional Nobel laureates
Films directed by Peter Flinth
Swedish drama films
2010s Swedish-language films
2010s Swedish films